The 2010 Armor All Bathurst 12 Hour was an endurance race for Group 3E Series Production Cars and other invited vehicles. The event, which was staged at the Mount Panorama Circuit, Bathurst, New South Wales, Australia on 14 February 2010, was the eighth running of the Bathurst 12 Hour, and the fourth since the race was revived in 2007. It was also Round 1 of the 2010 Australian Manufacturers' Championship.

Class structure
Cars competed in the following classes:
 Class A – High Performance All Wheel Drive
 Class B – High Performance Rear Wheel Drive
 Class C – Performance
 Class D – Production (Sport)
 Class E – Production (Small)
 Class F – Alternative Energy
 Class G – V8 Utes
 Class H – Mini Challenge
 Class I – Invitational

There were no starters in Class H.

Results

References

External links

 Official website
 Race results and images as archived at www.webcitation.org on 4 March 2010
 Race images from Phil Williams Media & Marketing

Motorsport in Bathurst, New South Wales
Armour All Bathurst 12 Hour
Australian Production Car Championship
February 2010 sports events in Australia